Thomas Lindall Winthrop (March 6, 1760 – February 22, 1841) was a Massachusetts politician who served as the 13th Lieutenant Governor of Massachusetts from 1826 to 1833. He was elected both a Fellow of the American Academy of Arts and Sciences in 1813 and a member of the American Antiquarian Society in 1837.

Early life
Winthrop was born in New London, Connecticut.  He was a son of John Still Winthrop (1720–1776) and Jane Borland Winthrop (1732–1760) and younger brother of Francis Bayard Winthrop (1754–1817).

Through his paternal grandparents, Ann Dudley (1684–1776) and John Winthrop, F.R.S. (1681–1747), he was a member of the Dudley–Winthrop family, a line that originates with Thomas Dudley—founder of Massachusetts and Winthrop's great-great-grandfather.  His paternal great-grandfathers were Joseph Dudley (1647–1720) and Wait Still Winthrop (1641/2–1717).

Career
In 1813, he was elected both a Fellow of the American Academy of Arts and Sciences, and a member of the American Antiquarian Society.

From 1826 to 1833, Winthrop served as the 13th Lieutenant Governor of Massachusetts.  He was a member of the Ancient and Honorable Artillery Company of Massachusetts and also served as a state representative and senator.

Personal life

In 1785, he married Elizabeth Bowdoin Temple (1769–1825), daughter of Sir John Temple, the first British envoy to the United States. and Elizabeth Bowdoin (1750–1809), daughter of James Bowdoin, who later became Governor of Massachusetts. Together, they were the parents of:

 Elizabeth Bowdoin Temple Winthrop (1787–1860), who married Benjamin Tappan (1788–1863)
 Sarah Bowdoin Winthrop (1788–1864), who married George O'Sullivan (1783–1866), the son of Gov. James Sullivan
 Anna Winthrop (d. 1850), who married Dr. John Collins Warren (1778–1856) in October 1843.
 George Winthrop (1805–1875)
 Grenville Temple Winthrop (1807–1853), who married Frances Maria Heard
 Robert Charles Winthrop (1809–1894), who served as a U.S. Senator and the Speaker of the U.S. House of Representatives

He died in Boston on February 22, 1841.

Descendants
Through his son Robert, he was the great-great-great-grandfather of John Kerry, the U.S. Senator and U.S. Secretary of State.

References
Notes

Sources

 The Journal and Letters of Samuel Curwen, 4th Ed., Little Brown and Company, 1864, p. 675  Internet Archive

1760 births
1841 deaths
Fellows of the American Academy of Arts and Sciences
Lieutenant Governors of Massachusetts
American people of English descent
Members of the American Antiquarian Society
People from New London, Connecticut
People of colonial Connecticut
Winthrop family